Millville is an unincorporated community in Liberty Township, Henry County, Indiana.

History
Millville was laid out and platted in 1854. It was named from the presence of a nearby mill. A post office was established at Millville in 1855, and remained in operation until it was discontinued in 1928.

Geography

Notable people
Millville was the birthplace of Wilbur Wright and is the location of the Wilbur Wright Birthplace and Museum. His brother Orville Wright was born in Dayton, Ohio.

References

Unincorporated communities in Henry County, Indiana
Unincorporated communities in Indiana
Wright brothers